Israel–Maldives relations refer to foreign relations between Israel and the Maldives. The countries had diplomatic relations from 1965 to 1974. From 2012 to 2017, they maintained cooperation agreements, but did not restore full diplomatic relations.

History
The Maldives established diplomatic relations with Israel in 1965, when Israel was the third state to recognize Maldives, and the Israeli ambassador was the first to present his credentials to the Maldives’ president. The Maldives suspended them in 1974.

In 2009, under president Mohamed Nasheed, the Maldives signed cooperation agreements with Israel on tourism, health, education, and culture. In 2010, the Israeli government sent a team of eye doctors to treat patients and train local medical personnel in the Maldives. 

In May 2011, the Maldives’s then-foreign minister, Ahmed Naseem, became the first top official from the Maldives to visit Israel, which he did on a four-day trip. However, the renewed relationship did not develop into full diplomatic relations.

In July 2018, under president Abdulla Yameen, the Maldives terminated the cooperation agreements with Israel and in 2014 announced a boycott of Israeli products, as Israel launched a military operation in Gaza.  Foreign minister Dunya Maumoon also announced that the Maldives would fully support Palestinians at international forums such as the United Nations Human Rights Council and offer them humanitarian aid.
 
In 2020, after UAE and Bahrain recognized Israel and a local media outlet reported the government had discussed establishing ties with Israel, the Maldivian foreign minister denied having initiated discussions regarding establishing ties with Israel.

In 2021, the Israeli Travel Company Caminos announced it would offer direct flights from the Maldives to Israel from September 6 to October 4 2021. The Maldives are popular among Israeli Tourists.

See also
Foreign relations of Israel
Foreign relations of the Maldives
International recognition of Israel

References

External links
 Minivan News

Maldives
Bilateral relations of the Maldives